Magnus Schjerfbeck (24 July 1860 — 8 May 1933) was a Finnish architect and architectural historian.

Education
Schjerfbeck studied at the Polytechnical Institute of Finland (later Helsinki University of Technology, now part of Aalto University, graduating in 1881.

Career
He worked in the Board of Public Building (Yleisten rakennusten ylihallitus; later Rakennushallitus, now Senate Properties) for most of his career, including as their lead architect from 1914 to 1926. In that role, Schjerfbeck made a significant contribution to the design and construction of public buildings of early 20th-century Finland.

Works

His more notable works and projects include:
The Scientific Societies' Building (Tieteellisten seurain talo) in Helsinki, now housing the Museum of Finnish Architecture
Hospitals and university clinics in eg. Helsinki, Oulu, Joensuu, Sortavala, Kajaani, Tampere, Kuopio and Vyborg
Alexander III's fishing lodge at Langinkoski
Restoration of Turku Cathedral
Restoration of the castles at Raseborg, Kastelhom and Käkisalmi

Artistic family
Schjerfbeck taught drawing and composition at the Central School of Industrial Design (Taideteollisuuskeskuskoulu; now part of Aalto University) for many years.

His sister was the painter Helene Schjerfbeck.

His daughter,  (1901-1975), was also a painter.

References

Finnish architects
People from Jakobstad
1860 births
1933 deaths
Aalto University alumni